The Association Sportive des Employés de Commerce Mimosas, literally Mimosas Commerce Employees' Sporting Association, is an Ivorian football club based in Abidjan. The club is also known as ASEC Mimosas Abidjan and ASEC Abidjan, especially in international club competitions. Founded in 1948, they are the most successful side in Ivorian football, having won the Ivorian Premier Division 24 times and the 1998 CAF Champions League. In addition, ASEC's Académie MimoSifcom has produced a number of famous players predominantly based in top foreign leagues, including Bonaventure Kalou, Didier Zokora, Emmanuel Eboué, Bakari Koné, Gervinho, Salomon Kalou, Romaric, Boubacar Barry, Didier Ya Konan, Kolo Touré, Yaya Touré and Odilon Kossounou, all of whom have played internationally.

History
ASEC Mimosas was founded on 1 January 1948 by a group of businessmen from Western Africa, Lebanon and France. The club originates from a place called Sol-béni (French for Holy Ground) in Abidjan-M'pouto, which today is the name of their training complex. In the following years, ASEC competed in the Championship of Abidjan together with their eternal rival Africa Sports, with their first professional coach being Frenchman Guy Fabre in 1954. Fabre also shaped the club's philosophy of que les enfants s'amusent... en jouant au football (may the children have fun... by playing football).

After Independence in 1960, ASEC won its first title in the newly found Premier Division in 1963. In the early 1970s, ASEC rose to power by winning the league title 5 out of 6 possible times from 1970 to 1975. This was the era of players as Laurent Pokou and Eustache Manglé. In the next years, it was Africa Sports who dominated the league, with ASEC winning only once in 1980.

On 19 November 1989, advocate Roger Ouégnin was elected as club president. In his wish to professionalize the club, he introduced Philippe Troussier as coach from 1989 until 1992. This was the time for ASEC to return to old strength, winning the championship six consecutive times between 1990 and 1995. ASEC also provided the backbone of the national team that won the 1992 African Cup of Nations, including key members of the side such as Ben Badi, Donald-Olivier Sié and Basile Aka Kouamé. After having qualified for the semi-finals already five times before, ASEC finally won the CAF Champions League in 1998. For some players, this was the chance to sign for a European club, for example team captain Tchiressoua Guel, who joined Olympique de Marseille afterwards. A few years later, ASEC beat their own record by winning the league seven consecutive times between 2000 and 2006.

In 1993, former French national player Jean-Marc Guillou joined the club staff as director, manager and financier. Together with chairman Roger Ouégnin, he founded the Académie MimoSifcom at Sol Béni. In the following weeks, they started to scout amongst thousands of young kids to form the first promotions to receive coaching and education. In 1999, following ASECs success in the 1998 Champions League, ASEC faced Espérance Sportive de Tunis in the CAF Super Cup. But most of the old players were aged, had left the club or at least wanted to. So Guillou and Ouégnin decided to replace the old squad with the first products of the academy, most of them only aged around 17/18 years. The owners protested against this measure and Espérance's president Slim Chiboub called it a "scandal to be playing against children". However, the young ASEC squad surprisingly beat their opponents by 3 to 1 goals and brought in the second big international title for their club. Amongst others, Boubacar 'Copa' Barry, Kolo Touré, Didier Zokora, Gilles Yapi Yapo, Siaka Tiéné, Abdoulaye Djire, Venance Zézé, and Aruna Dindane were part of that squad.

When Guillou became manager of Belgian side K.S.K. Beveren in 2001, many of the academy's players joined him. As a result, the Belgian team consisted mainly out of Ivorian players for several years. These could use Beveren as a chance to show their talent to top European clubs. Players as Yaya Touré, Arthur Boka, Emmanuel Eboué, Gervinho, Romaric and Copa all had their time in Beveren. This lasted until 2006, when Guillou and Beveren broke up with ASEC Mimosas.
ASEC then linked up with Charlton Athletic.

Satellite clubs
The following clubs are affiliated with ASEC:
  Charlton Athletic
  Feyenoord Fetteh

Académie MimoSifcom
ASECs youth academy has been described as the crown jewel of African football. The academy started by Roger Ouégnin and Jean-Marc Guillou in 1993 at ASEC's training complex has since produced many international stars. The student-athletes are given an education, for which they take classes in math, history, geography, physics, French, English, and Spanish. The students live in dorms during the week and have two training sessions a day. They play matches on Saturday and get health care and tutoring.

Current squad

Technical staff

Club life
The club's colours are yellow and black; the badge displays a Mimosa. Together with their biggest rival Africa Sports National, they contest the most important ivorian football derby. These two are also the only clubs allowed to play their home games in Stade Félix Houphouët-Boigny.

ASEC has, after own declarations, more than 8,000,000 fans in Ivory Coast and 15,000,000 in the whole region. The fans are called the Actionnaires. They are organised in the CNACO (Comité National d`Action et de Coordination, = National Committee for Action and Coordination), which has 40,000 members and consists out of 350 commissions.

Records
ASEC holds the world record for unbeaten league games, racking up 108 league and domestic cup games without loss between 1989 and 1994 before they were eventually beaten by SO Armee; four more than the unbeaten run of Steaua București in the late 1980s.

Honours

Domestic
Côte d'Ivoire Premier Division: 27
1963, 1970, 1972, 1973, 1974, 1975, 1980, 1990, 1991, 1992, 1993, 1994, 1995, 1997, 1998, 2000, 2001, 2002, 2003, 2004, 2005, 2006, 2009, 2010, 2017, 2018, 2021.

Côte d'Ivoire Cup: 20
 1962, 1967, 1968, 1969, 1970, 1972, 1973, 1983, 1990, 1995, 1997, 1999, 2003, 2005, 2007, 2008, 2011, 2013, 2014, 2018.

Félix Houphouët-Boigny Cup: 16
 1975, 1980, 1983, 1990, 1994, 1995, 1997, 1998, 1999, 2004, 2006, 2007, 2008, 2009, 2011, 2017.

International
CAF Champions League: 1 
1998
CAF Super Cup: 1 
1999
West African Club Championship (UFOA Cup): 1 
1990

Peace Cup: 1 
2001

Performance in CAF competitions
CAF Champions League: 15 appearances

1998 – Winners
1999 – Group stage/Semi-finals 
2001 – Group stage (Top 8)
2002 – Semi-finals 
2003 – Group stage (Top 8)

2004 – First round
2005 – Group stage (Top 8)
2006 – Semi-finals
2007 – Group stage (Top 8)
2008 – Group stage (Top 8)

2009 – Second round
2010 – First round
2011 – Second round
2018 – First round
2018-2019 – Group stage (Top 16)

 African Cup of Champions Clubs: 12 appearances

1964 – Preliminary round
1971 – Semi-finals
1973 – Second round
1974 – Quarter-finals

1975 – Quarter-finals
1976 – Semi-finals
1981 – Quarter-finals
1991 – Quarter-finals

1992 – Semi-finals
1993 – Semi-finals
1995 – Finalist
1996 – Second round

CAF Confederation Cup: 9 appearances

2009 – Second round of 16
2011 – Group stage (Top 8)
2012 – Second round
2013 – Second round 

2014 – Group stage (Top 8)
2015 – Second round of 16
2017 – Second round of 16
2018 – Group stage (Top 16)
2021-2022 – Group stage (Top 16)

CAF Cup Winners' Cup: 4 appearances
1983 – Semi-finals
1984 – Quarter-finals
1987 – Second round
2000 – First round

Former managers

Former presidents

References

External links
 Official website
 The Mimosifcom academy way – These Football Times (2015)

 
Association football clubs established in 1948
Football clubs in Ivory Coast
Football clubs in Abidjan
1948 establishments in Ivory Coast
Sports clubs in Ivory Coast
CAF Champions League winning clubs
CAF Super Cup winning clubs